Purnell Cecil Mincy (February 14, 1916 – April 20, 2003) was an American Negro league pitcher from 1938 to 1940.

A native of Statesboro, Georgia, Mincy attended Lakewood High School in Lakewood Township, New Jersey, where he was an all-state selection in football, basketball and baseball. He made his Negro leagues debut in 1938 with the Pittsburgh Crawfords, and went on to play for the Philadelphia Stars, New York Black Yankees, and Newark Eagles. Mincy's baseball career ended due to an elbow injury in 1941. He died in New York, New York in 2003 at age 87.

References

External links
 and Seamheads

1916 births
2003 deaths
Baseball players from New Jersey
Lakewood High School (New Jersey) alumni
New York Black Yankees players
Newark Eagles players
People from Lakewood Township, New Jersey
People from Statesboro, Georgia
Philadelphia Stars players
Pittsburgh Crawfords players
Sportspeople from Ocean County, New Jersey
20th-century African-American sportspeople
Baseball pitchers
21st-century African-American people